Robert L. Banks (November 24, 1921 – January 3, 1989) was an American chemist. He was born and grew up in Piedmont, Missouri. He attended the University of Missouri - Rolla, and initiated into Alpha Phi Omega in 1940. He joined the Phillips Petroleum company in 1946 and worked there until he retired in 1985.  He died in Missouri on January 3, 1989.

Technical contributions
He was a fellow research chemist of J. Paul Hogan. They began working together in 1946, and in 1951 invented "crystalline polypropylene" and high-density polyethylene (HDPE). These plastics were initially known by the name Marlex. The polymerization of ethylene was made possible by their discovery of the so-called Phillips catalyst.

Recognition
In 1987, Banks and Hogan won the Perkin Medal, and in 2001 they were inducted into the National Inventors Hall of Fame. Both were given a Heroes of Chemistry award by the American Chemical Society in 1989. Dr. Banks was inducted into the Plastics Hall of Fame in 2014.

References

External links
Robert Banks biography at National Inventors Hall of Fame

1921 births
1989 deaths
Polymer scientists and engineers
Missouri University of Science and Technology alumni
20th-century American inventors
Chemists from Missouri